The Old Naini Bridge is one of the longest and oldest bridges in India, located in Prayagraj. It is a double-decked steel truss bridge which runs across the Yamuna river in the southern part of the city. The bridge runs north-south across the Yamuna river connecting the city of Prayagraj to the neighbouring area of Naini. Its upper deck has a two lane railway line which connects Naini Junction railway station to Allahabad Junction railway station, while the lower deck has successfully been facilitating roadway services since 1927.

See also
 List of tourist attractions in Allahabad
 List of longest bridges above water in India
 List of bridges in India
 List of bridges
 New Yamuna Bridge, Allahabad
List of road–rail bridges

References

Buildings and structures in Allahabad
Bridges completed in 1865
Truss bridges
Railway bridges in Uttar Pradesh
Transport in Allahabad
Bridges over Yamuna River
History of rail transport in Uttar Pradesh